Elizabeth Adams may refer to:
 A. Elizabeth Adams (1892–1962), American zoologist
 Elizabeth Adams (madam) (1933 or 1934–1995), known as Madam Alex, Hollywood madam
 Elizabeth Laura Adams (1909–1982), African-American Catholic writer
 Elizabeth Nelson Adams (1941–2020), American artist and writer
 Elizabeth Sparks Adams (1911–2007), American historian
 Elizabeth McCord (character) was born Elizabeth Adams and goes by "Elizabeth Adams McCord"